Benjamin Riley Underwood (30 September 1901 − 9 March 1958) was an English footballer who played as a left half.

He was born in Alfreton, Derbyshire and began playing with Newton Rangers before joining New Hucknall Colliery. After a brief spell with Sutton Town, Underwood signed for Derby County, but made no first-team appearances, and went on to play League football for Doncaster Rovers, where he made 105 appearances in competitions. He moved to Leeds United, only managing to break into the first team for a few matches, before going on to Coventry City for two seasons.

He married near Derby in 1928 and died in the Bridgnorth area in 1958.

References

1901 births
1958 deaths
People from Alfreton
Footballers from Derbyshire
English footballers
Association football wing halves
New Hucknall Colliery F.C. players
Sutton Town A.F.C. players
Derby County F.C. players
Doncaster Rovers F.C. players
Leeds United F.C. players
Coventry City F.C. players
English Football League players